The women's javelin throw at the 2022 World Athletics U20 Championships was held at the Estadio Olímpico Pascual Guerrero on 1 and 2 August.

18 athletes from 13 countries were entered to the competition, however 16 of them competed.

Records

Results

Qualification
The qualification started on 1 August at 09:05. Athletes attaining a mark of at least 54.50 metres ( Q ) or at least the 12 best performers ( q ) qualified for the final.

Final
The final started on 2 August on 17:23.

References

Javelin throw
Javelin throw at the World Athletics U20 Championships